The 1951 Scottish Grand Prix was a 50 lap  motor race held on 21 July 1951 at Winfield Airfield in Berwickshire. Although run to Formula One regulations, the paucity of the entries led to the organisers opening up the race to other categories.

An entry had been made for the BRM Type 15 but it failed to appear. Its driver Reg Parnell was loaned local driver John Brown's HWM-Alta; Parnell started from pole position but broke a drive shaft as he left the start line. Archie Butterworth's 4WD A.J.B. led briefly before David Murray took over with a Maserati 4CLT. Joe Kelly's Alta challenged and set fastest  lap but retired with gearbox problems. Murray retired with fuel pump problems and Philip Fotheringham-Parker took the lead in Duncan Hamilton's Maserati 4CL, chased home by Gillie Tyrer's BMW 328. Ian Stewart was third in an XK120.

Results

References

Other reading

Scottish
Scottish Grand Prix
Sport in the Scottish Borders
Sports competitions in Scotland
Scottish Grand Prix
Scottish Grand Prix
Scottish Grand Prix